Liv is a surname, and people with the surname include:

 Kwamie Liv (born 1985), a Danish-Zambian artist, singer and songwriter
 Stefan Liv (1980–2011), a Polish-born Swedish professional ice hockey goaltender
 Steven Liv, birth name of Hans Sama, French League of Legends player